Route 824 or Highway 824 can refer to:

Canada
Alberta Highway 824

United States
 
 
 
 
 
 
 
  (former)